The Professional (original title: Le Professionnel) is a 1981 French action thriller film directed by Georges Lautner. The film stars Jean-Paul Belmondo as the title role. The film is based on  award-winning 1976 novel Death of a Thin-Skinned Animal by Patrick Alexander.

The film was a commercial success upon its theatrical release and was the fourth most watched feature film in France in 1981 behind La Chèvre, Raiders of the Lost Ark and The Fox and the Hound, selling 5,243,559 tickets.

The music was composed by Ennio Morricone, and the main theme "Chi Mai" became an instrumental hit and subsequent classic.

The famous final scene of the movie was made in Château de Maintenon.

Plot
French secret agent Josselin Beaumont is sent to kill Colonel Njala, the dictator of Malagawi, a fictional African country. However, before he manages to accomplish his mission, the political situation changes drastically and the French secret service resorts to handing over Beaumont to the Malagawian authorities. After a long, unfair trial, during which Beaumont is injected with drugs, he is sentenced to long-term penal servitude at a "re-education camp".

Following a daring escape with an African inmate, he returns to France and informs the French secret service of his presence, promising that he will kill Njala, who is in France for an official visit, thus getting his revenge on the people who betrayed him. The secret service responds by setting other agents on Beaumont's trail. However, he manages to remain one step ahead, humiliating and killing some of his major betrayers, including Rosen, the sadistic chief of the secret police. After Rosen falls in a gunfight, Beaumont takes Rosen's identity card and puts his dogtags on his body, spreading confusion within the secret service and temporarily reducing Njala's guard. Beaumont eventually tricks a secret service agent into shooting the dictator. While government officials confer with higher authorities, he slowly walks towards Njala's helicopter, but is shot dead by government agents, who have received the order to do so.

Cast 
 Jean-Paul Belmondo as Josselin “Joss” Beaumont
 Robert Hossein as le commissaire Rosen
 Bernard-Pierre Donnadieu as l'inspecteur Farges
 Jean Desailly as le ministre
 Cyrielle Clair as Alice Ancelin
 Marie-Christine Descouard as Doris Frederiksen
 Elisabeth Margoni as Jeanne Beaumont
 Jean-Louis Richard as le colonel Martin
 Michel Beaune as le capitaine Valeras
 Pierre Saintons as le président N'Jala
 Pascal N'Zonzi as Arthur
 Gérard Darrieu as l'instructeur Picard
 Sidiki Bakaba as le prisonnier évadé
 Dany Kogan as sergent Gruber
 Marc Lamole as le serveur d'hôtel
 Radisa Steve Jovanovic as a policeman

See also

 Françafrique

References

External links
 
 
 

1981 action thriller films
1980s crime action films
1981 crime drama films
1980s crime thriller films
1981 films
Films scored by Ennio Morricone
French films about revenge
Films based on British novels
Films directed by Georges Lautner
Films set in Africa
Films set in France
Films set in Paris
Films set in a fictional country
French crime action films
French spy films
French crime drama films
French action thriller films
French crime thriller films
Films with screenplays by Jacques Audiard
Films with screenplays by Michel Audiard
Gaumont Film Company films
1980s French films